The 2011–12 season was the 14th consecutive season in the third tier of the English football league system played by Oldham Athletic Association Football Club, a professional association football club based in Oldham, Greater Manchester, England.

League table

Squad statistics

First-team squad
Includes all players who were awarded squad numbers during the season.

 (Captain)

 

 

 (Player/Coach)
 (Player/Manager)

Appearances and goals

Top scorers

Transfers

In

Out

Loaned in

Loaned out

Results

Friendlies

League One

FA Cup

League Cup

Football League Trophy

References 

Oldham Athletic A.F.C. seasons
Oldham Athletic